Warren Fellows (born 13 September 1953) is an Australian former drug courier who was sentenced to life imprisonment in Thailand in 1978 for his role in a heroin trafficking operation that took place from Perth to Bangkok. In his best-selling book The Damage Done, Fellows describes the violence and harsh conditions he experienced in Thailand prisons.

Biography

Early life
Fellows was born in Sydney, Australia. His father Bill Fellows, was a champion jockey and horse trainer who won the 1949 Melbourne Cup on Foxzami. He was the youngest of three children, but his two-year-old sister Gail, died in 1950 from a "bowel complication". His older brother Gary died when he was 36 years old. Gary was living with his wife Carole and two sons Brett and Rodney. He also had a son named Adrian Simon who wrote "Milk-Blood". Fellows was educated at De La Salle College, a Catholic school for boys in Ashfield. Fellows claims he was nearly expelled from the school when he was caught running a horse betting operation from his school desk. Warren left De La Salle College and went to Randwick North High School.

Drug trafficking
Fellows worked in various jobs, including as a barman and an apprentice hairdresser in Double Bay. It was through his bar work that he first became involved with drug trafficking, successfully importing hash from India with a friend. On his return to Australia he married and had a child. Word got out about the successful drug run and a customer in the bar where Fellows worked employed him to travel to Los Angeles, Hawaii and South America to smuggle cocaine into Australia. Fellows came to know drug dealer William Sinclair, who took him to Bangkok, Thailand where he was introduced to Neddy Smith and made his first successful attempt at smuggling heroin into Australia.

After returning to Australia, Neddy Smith who was impressed with his smuggling skills, contacted Fellows and offered him a job. Smith did not have the notoriety he had later, but was already a major and feared figure in the Sydney criminal world. Fellows claims he became involved with Smith because he was "young and impressionable" and flattered that he "was liked by a man most people were terrified of". Fellows worked for Smith as a drug courier, domestically and internationally.

Thailand
In October 1978, Smith instructed Fellows to again travel to Bangkok, this time in the company of Smith's brother-in-law Paul Hayward. Hayward played professional rugby league with the Newtown Jets and had been selected to represent Australia as a boxer at the 1976 Summer Olympics in Montreal, Canada. Hayward had done "favours" for Smith, but this was his first international job. Fellows and Hayward became best friends. Prior to leaving Australia, Fellows was tipped off by a friend with a police contact at Manly, that the Commonwealth Police believed he was involved in a large drug importation operation and had him under surveillance. Fellows reported this to Smith who dismissed it, claiming that he would have been informed if it were true. Smith insisted they continue with the job.

Hayward and Fellows became increasingly apprehensive, but after Smith lost his patience with them and made implied threats, they reluctantly agreed to go through with the trip. Fellows was particularly anxious about returning to Bangkok. During his last trip in February 1978, he had been forced to abandon a package of heroin he had been attempting to ship back to Australia and feared that Thai police may have found it and been able to trace the drugs back to him. So Fellows procured a false passport through a friend, in the name of a deceased child Gregory Hastings Barker. Smith later said that Fellows got done because he booked his flight using Smith's telephone, although Fellows says that he can not remember whether he booked it with Smiths phone or not.

On arriving in Thailand, Fellows and Hayward met William Sinclair by chance. Sinclair now lived in Bangkok and owned the Texas Bar. Sinclair took them to his bar, and in a drunken state, attempted to obtain information from them about their trip. Unbeknown to them, the trio were under surveillance and the meeting appeared to police to incriminate Sinclair, even though according to Fellows, he was not involved. Fellows claims that there were many warning signs and that the night before they were arrested he had a "moment of clarity" and resolved to wash the heroin down the bath drain. But he fell asleep and was woken in the morning by police.

Arrest
On 12 October 1978, the rooms occupied by Fellows and Hayward at the Montien Hotel in Bangkok were raided by Thai police. The pair were arrested when 8.5 kilograms of heroin was found in a suitcase in Hayward's room. Fellows alleges they were subjected to physical and psychological abuse at the hands of Thai Narcotics Suppression Unit officers who demanded they sign statements which they could not read because they were written in Thai. The officers demanded Fellows and Hayward make statements incriminating Sinclair. Fellows claims they resisted because Sinclair was innocent, but he eventually relented when officers informed them they were to be executed without trial under Article 27 of the military law and dragged Hayward outside for execution. Fellows and Hayward agreed to sign the statement and Sinclair was arrested and charged.

The three men were sent to Bambat remand centre at Klong Prem Central Prison, but after plotting an escape attempt were moved to "Maha Chai" the Special Bangkok Metropolitan Prison on Maha Chai Road (now the Bangkok Corrections Museum). They spent three years in Maha Chai before they were convicted of heroin trafficking. Sinclair and Fellows were sentenced to life imprisonment and Hayward was sentenced to 30 years' jail. They were sent to the Lard Yao prison but after five days there when Sinclair attempted to bribe the wrong guard, they were transferred to Bangkwang. Two years later, Sinclair's conviction was overturned on appeal in 1983. Hayward was later returned to Lard Yao, and later received a royal pardon and was released from Lard Yao on 7 April 1989. Fellows received a royal pardon and was released from Bangkwang on 11 January 1990.

Whilst imprisoned in Thailand, Fellows attempted suicide several times, one he recalls was when he was locked into a darkroom he wrapped a sarong around his neck and tied it to a hook on the ceiling; however, he claimed as he felt his bowels fall the sarong snapped, causing him to fall, saving him. Fellows became addicted to heroin. He claimed that heroin was easily available in Thai prisons and was the only form of escape from the appalling conditions. In his autobiography The Damage Done, he expressed great sympathy for those afflicted by addiction to drugs. He writes that it was "an outstanding case of poetic justice" that he should become addicted himself.

Return to Australia
On his return to Australia, he spent two weeks in a hospital being treated for malnutrition and pneumonia. He expressed concern regarding his and Paul Hayward's ability to adapt back into society, an issue which he claims played a part in Hayward's death in 1992 from a heroin overdose. Fellows explains how he still has hallucinations of strange abnormal creatures hovering over him and watching him. Furthermore, Fellows claims that he has the same nightmare once a year or so, regarding him lying on a beach with two beautiful women feeling free and happy, however as he begins to walk off into the sunset he turns around and notices that the two girls have disappeared and that he is back in the Thailand Prison where a guard is calling his name telling him to go in his cell. Fellows says that although he is released from Bangkwang he will never be free from the tortures in his mind. In the late 2000s, Fellows commented in the media on the cases of the Bali Nine and Schapelle Corby.

Popular culture
Sheffield four-piece band Harrisons penned a song entitled "Simmer Away" after reading The Damage Done.

See also
List of Australians in international prisons

References

Bibliography

External links
Excerpt from The Damage Done.

Australian drug traffickers
1953 births
Living people
People from Sydney
Australian people imprisoned abroad
Prisoners sentenced to life imprisonment by Thailand
Australian prisoners sentenced to life imprisonment
Drugs in Thailand